Megaphasma is a genus of walking sticks in the family Diapheromeridae. There are at least two described species in Megaphasma.

Species
These two species belong to the genus Megaphasma:
 Megaphasma denticrus (Stål, 1875) (giant walkingstick)
 Megaphasma furcatum (Brunner von Wattenwyl, 1907)

References

Further reading

 

Phasmatodea
Articles created by Qbugbot